Beqiri is an Albanian surname. Notable people with the surname include:

 Ardit Beqiri, Albanian footballer
 Argjend Beqiri, Macedonian footballer
 Elvin Beqiri, Albanian footballer
 Fahri Beqiri, Albanian composer
 Orjand Beqiri, Albanian footballer
 Shemsi Beqiri, Albanian-Swiss kickboxer

Albanian-language surnames
Patronymic surnames